Kirby Lake is a lake in Sibley County, in the U.S. state of Minnesota.

Kirby Lake was named for James Patterson Kirby, an Irish settler.

See also
List of lakes in Minnesota

References

Lakes of Minnesota
Lakes of Sibley County, Minnesota